Thyrohyoid ligament can refer to:
 Lateral thyrohyoid ligament
 Median thyrohyoid ligament